Shirakan may refer to:
 Shirakan, Anzal
 Shirakan, Silvaneh